B-cell lymphoma/leukemia 11A is a protein that in humans is encoded by the BCL11A gene.

Function 

The BCL11A gene encodes for a regulatory C2H2 type zinc-finger protein, that can bind to the DNA. Five alternatively spliced transcript variants of this gene, which encode distinct isoforms, have been reported. The protein associates with the SWI/SNF complex, that regulates gene expression via chromatin remodeling.

BCL11A is highly expressed in several hematopoietic lineages, and plays a role in the switch from γ- to β-globin expression during the fetal to adult erythropoiesis transition.

Furthermore, BCL11A is expressed in the brain, where it forms a protein complex with CASK to regulate axon outgrowth and branching. In the neocortex, BCL11A binds to the TBR1 regulatory region and inhibits the expression of TBR1.

Clinical significance 
The corresponding Bcl11a mouse gene is a common site of retroviral integration in myeloid leukemia, and may function as a leukemia disease gene, in part, through its interaction with BCL6. During hematopoietic cell differentiation, this gene is down-regulated. It is possibly involved in lymphoma pathogenesis since translocations associated with B-cell malignancies also deregulates its expression. In addition, BCL11A has been found to play a role in the suppression of fetal hemoglobin production. Therapeutic strategies aimed at increasing fetal globin production in diseases such as beta thalassemia and sickle cell anemia by inhibiting BCL11A are currently being explored.

Furthermore, heterozygous de novo mutations in BCL11A have been identified in an intellectual disability disorder, accompanied with global developmental delay and autism spectrum disorder. These mutations disrupt BCL11A homodimerization and transcriptional regulation.

BCL11A has also been identified as an important gene of interest in type-2 diabetes. Methylation of BCl11A has been hypothesized to contribute to type-2 diabetes risk, while BCL11a loss in a human islet model was demonstrated to result in an increase in insulin secretion.

Interactions 

BCL11A has been shown to interact with a number of proteins. BCL11A was initially discovered as a COUP-TFI interacting protein. In the nucleus, BCL11A forms paraspeckles that co-localize with NONO. In neurons, BCL11A interacts with CASK to regulate target genes. Furthermore, BCL11A interacts with the neuron-specific protein TBR1, which is also implicated in intellectual disability and autism spectrum disorder.

References

Further reading

External links 
 
 
 

Transcription factors